Ibrahim Aboubacar (born 1 February 1965 in Fomboni, the Comoros) is a French politician who was the French National Assembly deputy for Mayotte's 2nd constituency from 2012 to 2017.

Biography 
Aboubacar and his family lived in Moroni until the Comoros gained independence in 1975. They then moved to Sada, Mayotte. 

In 1980, Aboubacar was sent to Réunion by his family, where he completed his secondary education. Aboubacar then undertook engineering studies in Paris, with the intention of returning to Mayotte to work towards the development of the region.

In 1990, after having earned a degree in engineering at the École spéciale des travaux publics (ESTP), Aboubacar finally returned to Mayotte. There he worked in an urban planning agency for five years. During this time, he was involved in trade union activism and eventually became the spokesperson for the Mayotte Workers' Union, and entered into politics during the 1992 municipal elections.

Elected successively to the position of economic and social adviser of Mayotte from 1999 to 2004, and city councillor in the commune of Sada from 2008 to 2012, Aboubacar was elected as the 1st vice-president of the Departmental Council of Mayotte in 2012. He abandoned the role soon after, as he was elected as a member of the Socialist Party of Mayotte's second constituency in the same year. However, Aboubacar was eliminated in the first round of the 2017 French legislative election, finishing in third place with 11.37% of votes. His constituency was won in the second round by former MP, Republican candidate Mansour Kamardine.

Political positions 
Aboubacar's activity in politics is particularly concerned with the social and economic development of Mayotte, as he believes that the process of departmentalisation in Mayotte has not yet been completed.

In contrast to the majority of his party, Aboubacar argues for a restriction on obtaining French nationality for children born in Mayotte to illegal immigrants, as a means of "combatting smuggling networks, which are hiding all sorts of trafficking".

Aboubacar also calls for the Departmental Council of Mayotte to change the status of Port de Longoni in Longoni, Mayotte, to a major port of France.

References

1965 births
Living people
French people of Comorian descent
Mayotte politicians
Comorian politicians
Black French politicians
Deputies of the 14th National Assembly of the French Fifth Republic
People from Mayotte
Deputies from Mayotte